Jonathan Estrada (born November 28, 2000), is an American college soccer player who plays as a forward for the University of California, Berkeley and San Francisco Glens.

Estrada previously played in the USL Championship on an amateur contract for LA Galaxy II.

Club career

College 
After the 2017 USL season, Estrada signed a National Letter of Intent to play college soccer at the University of California, Berkeley. Estrada made his collegiate debut on August 24, 2018 in a 2–1 victory over Detroit Mercy. Estrada primarily spent his freshman season as a reserve and rotation player before becoming a starter at the end of the 2018 NCAA Division I men's soccer season. He made his first collegiate start on November 1, 2018 in a 1–2 loss against UCLA. Estrada played 80 minutes in the match.

During his sophomore year, Estrada became a regular started with Cal's soccer program. He scored his first collegiate goal on September 21, 2019 in a 1–2 loss against Stanford.

Senior 
Estrada made his senior debut in a 1–1 draw with Orange County SC. He played 60 minutes before being replaced by Ariel Lassiter.

In 2022, Estrada signed with the San Francisco Glens in USL League Two.

References

External links
 
 
 Jonathan Estrada at US Soccer
 Jonathan Estrada at University of California Athletics

2000 births
Living people
Association football forwards
American soccer players
California Golden Bears men's soccer players
LA Galaxy II players
USL Championship players
Sportspeople from Santa Ana, California
Soccer players from California